John Edward Marriott (16 February 1913 – 13 April 1994) was an Australian politician.

Born in Elliott, Tasmania, the fourth son of Frank Marriott and Alice Maud , he was educated at Launceston Church Grammar School and later in Hobart at The Hutchins School before joining the military in 1939. He enlisted in the Australian Imperial Force in June 1940 and was commissioned as a lieutenant in July 1942. He was demobilised in October 1945 as an honorary captain.. He was a staff member with the Tasmanian Liberal Party from 1945 to 1949, and was Secretary to the Tasmanian Opposition Leader 1949–1953.

In 1953, he was appointed to the Australian Senate as a Liberal Senator for Tasmania following the death of Senator Jack Chamberlain. On 14 September 1971 he was appointed an Assistant Minister, holding office until the McMahon coalition government was defeated in December 1972. He was dropped from the Liberal ticket for the 1975 election and retired.

His father Frank and brother Fred were both members of the Tasmanian House of Assembly.

Marriott died in 1994 (aged 81).

References

1913 births
1994 deaths
Liberal Party of Australia members of the Parliament of Australia
Members of the Australian Senate for Tasmania
Members of the Australian Senate
20th-century Australian politicians
Australian people of English descent